The Sons of Pitches are a British vocal group who specialize in a cappella and beatbox. They won the BBC 2 television series, The Naked Choir, in 2015 with six members, Joseph Novelli, Joseph Hinds, Joseph Belham, James Hughes, Joshua Mallett and Midé Adenaike.

The Sons of Pitches were formed in 2013 when they were all studying at the University of Birmingham. The three Joes are known amongst the group as Novs, Bells and Hinds. Jamie Hughes left the group in 2019 to pursue a career outside of music.

The group had their cover of Skrillex’s Scary Monsters and Nice Sprites selected for Sing 12, the Contemporary A Cappella Society Association’s compilation CD.

Following their success on The Naked Choir, in 2016 they embarked on a 26-date tour of the UK. They toured the UK with a new stage show in 2017, celebrating the world of television. They have performed in the USA and Asia as well as at the International Championship of Collegiate A Cappella Final in New York, the Hong Kong International A Cappella Festival, the Edinburgh Fringe Festival.

References

External links

British vocal groups
A cappella musical groups
Musical groups established in 2013
2013 establishments in England